The 2006 NPF Senior Draft is the third annual NPF Draft.  It was held February 15, 2006 to assign division I college players to pro teams for 2006 season.  Athletes are not allowed by the NCAA to sign professional contracts until their collegiate seasons have ended.  The first selection was Texas's Cat Osterman, picked by the Connecticut Brakettes.  Osterman chose not to sign with the Brakettes.  The Brakettes' rights to her expired after the 2006, after which she signed with the Rockford Thunder.

2006 NPF Senior Draft

Following are the 30 selections from the 2006 NPF Senior Draft:

Position key: 
C = Catcher; UT = Utility infielder; INF = Infielder; 1B = First base; 2B =Second base SS = Shortstop; 3B = Third base; OF = Outfielder; RF = Right field; CF = Center field; LF = Left field;  P = Pitcher; RHP = right-handed Pitcher; LHP = left-handed Pitcher; DP =Designated player
Positions are listed as combined for those who can play multiple positions.

Round 1

Round 2

Round 3

Round 4

Draft notes

References 

2007 in softball
National Pro Fastpitch drafts